Fush Yu Mang is the debut studio album by American rock band Smash Mouth, released on July 8, 1997, by Interscope Records. It includes their first major hit, "Walkin' on the Sun", which was the last song to be added onto the album. The title of the album was taken from a line ("fuck you, man!") slurred by Al Pacino in Scarface. On the cover of the album is the band in guitarist Greg Camp's 1962 Ford Falcon Squire wagon flying through space with an outstretched arm giving the finger. The title is written in a stylized, pseudo-Asian font. The album also features a cover of War's "Why Can't We Be Friends?". The initial release was given a Parental Advisory label, while later releases were not. Fush Yu Mang has been certified double-platinum by the RIAA in the U.S. for sales in excess of 2 million.

An acoustic re-recording of Fush Yu Mang was planned in 2017 through PledgeMusic for the album's 20th anniversary, and was released on June 29, 2018.

Musical style
Fush Yu Mang song "Walkin' on the Sun" has a 1960s psychedelic soul and  music style compared to songs by 1960s music groups like the Zombies and the Yardbirds. The rest of Fush Yu Mang has been described as pop-punk, and ska punk. Fush Yu Mang is influenced by genres like punk rock, ska, reggae, and speed metal. The album shares traits with bands like No Doubt and Goldfinger.

Track listing

20th Anniversary bonus tracks

Personnel 
Smash Mouth

Steve Harwell – lead vocals 
Paul De Lisle – bass, backing vocals
Greg Camp – guitar, backing vocals, co-lead vocals on "Padrino"
Kevin Coleman – drums
 Michael Klooster – keyboards, programming, backing vocals

Additional personnel
 Eric Valentine – percussion
 Les Harris – saxophone
 John Gibson – trumpet
 John Gove – trombone

Charts

Weekly charts

Year-end charts

References

External links

Fush Yu Mang at YouTube (streamed copy where licensed)
 The official Smash Mouth site
 Unfinished review of Fush Yu Mang by Smash Mouth along with the review of Floored by Sugar Ray from Rolling Stone

Smash Mouth albums
1997 debut albums
Interscope Records albums
Albums produced by Eric Valentine